"Running with Lions" is a song recorded by Swedish singer Alice Svensson. The song was released as a digital download in Sweden on 25 February 2017 and peaked at number 87 on the Swedish Singles Chart. It took part in Melodifestivalen 2017, and placed fifth in the fourth semi-final on 25 February 2017. It was written by Anderz Wrethov, Andreas "Stone" Johansson, Denniz Jamm, and Svensson.

Track listing

Chart performance

Release history

References

2017 singles
2016 songs
English-language Swedish songs
Melodifestivalen songs of 2017
Swedish pop songs
Songs written by Wrethov